Mastník is a municipality and village in Třebíč District in the Vysočina Region of the Czech Republic. It has about 200 inhabitants.

Geography
Mastník is located in the Jevišovice Uplands.

Notable people
Jan Zahradníček (1905–1960), poet

References

Villages in Třebíč District